Paciocinebrina is a genus of sea snail, a marine gastropod mollusk in the family Muricidae, the murex snails or rock snails.

Species 
The World Register of Marine Species accepts the following species within Paciocinebrina:

 Paciocinebrina atropurpurea (Carpenter, 1865)
 Paciocinebrina barbarensis (Gabb, 1865)
 Paciocinebrina benitoensis Houart, Vermeij & Wiedrick, 2019
 Paciocinebrina bormannae Wiedrick & Houart, 2020
 Paciocinebrina circumtexta (Stearns, 1871)
 Paciocinebrina crispatissima (Berry, 1953)
 Paciocinebrina foveolata (Hinds, 1844)
 Paciocinebrina fraseri (Oldroyd, 1920)
 Paciocinebrina gracillima (Stearns, 1871)
 Paciocinebrina grandilurida Wiedrick & Houart, 2020
 Paciocinebrina grippi (Dall, 1911)
 Paciocinebrina interfossa (Carpenter, 1864)
 Paciocinebrina lurida (Middendorff, 1848)
 Paciocinebrina macleani Houart, Vermeij & Wiedrick, 2019
 Paciocinebrina mininterfossa Wiedrick & Houart, 2020
 Paciocinebrina minor (Dall, 1919)
 Paciocinebrina munda (Carpenter, 1864)
 Paciocinebrina murphyorum Wiedrick & Houart, 2020
 Paciocinebrina neobarbarensis Houart, Vermeij & Wiedrick, 2019
 Paciocinebrina pseudomunda Houart, Vermeij & Wiedrick, 2019
 Paciocinebrina pseudopusilla Wiedrick & Houart, 2020
 Paciocinebrina pusilla Wiedrick & Houart, 2020
 Paciocinebrina sclera (Dall, 1919)
 Paciocinebrina seftoni (Chace, 1958)
 †Paciocinebrina squamulifera (Carpenter, 1869) 
 Paciocinebrina thelmacrowae Houart, Vermeij & Wiedrick, 2019

References

External links
 Houart, R.; Vermeij, G.; Wiedrick, S. (2019). New taxa and new synonymy in Muricidae (Neogastropoda: Pagodulinae, Trophoninae, Ocenebrinae) from the Northeast Pacific. Zoosymposia. 13(1): 184-241

Ocenebrinae
Gastropods described in 1871
Gastropod genera